Rieni is a commune in Bihor County, Crișana, Romania with a population of 3,050 people. It is composed of six villages: Cucuceni (Kakucsány), Ghighișeni (Gyegyesény), Petrileni (Petrelény), Rieni, Sudrigiu (Kisszedres) and Valea de Jos (Alsófeketevölgy).

Natives
Vasile Blaga (born 1956), politician

References

Rieni
Localities in Crișana